Live from Austin, TX is a live album recorded by Neko Case on August 9, 2003, on the Austin City Limits Television series. The performance aired on PBS on November 8, 2003, was released on DVD in 2006, and appeared on compact disc on January 9, 2007. Aside from "Behind the House" and a cover of Bob Dylan's "Buckets of Rain," all songs appear on previous Case albums.

Track listing
 "Favorite" – 3:29
 "Outro with Bees" – 1:24
 "Behind the House" – 3:02
 "Ghost Wiring" – 2:42
 "Deep Red Bells" – 3:45
 "Knock Loud" – 2:17
 "Hex" – 4:46
 "Maybe Sparrow" – 2:40
 "Wayfaring Stranger" – 3:00
 "Furnace Room Lullaby" – 2:54
 "In California" – 3:20
 "Buckets of Rain" – 2:48
 "Look for Me (I'll Be Around)" – 3:25
 "Alone and Forsaken" – 3:04

References

External links
 Austin City Limits - Watch Online - PBS Video
 New West Records - Austin City Limits series (DVD/CD)

Neko Case live albums
2007 live albums
2006 video albums
Live video albums
New West Records live albums
New West Records video albums
Austin City Limits
Neko Case video albums